Hypatia (c. 370–415), was a Greek scholar and philosopher who was considered the first notable woman in mathematics.

Hypatia may also refer to:

Fiction
Hypatia (novel) by Charles Kingsley
Hypatia, a character based on Hypatia of Alexandria in the series The Heirs of Alexandria by Mercedes Lackey, Eric Flint and Dave Freer
Hypatia, a character based on Hypatia of Alexandria in the novel Baudolino by Umberto Eco
Hypatia, the main character in the 2009 film Agora, played by Rachel Weisz
Dr. Alexandria Hypatia, a character named for Hypatia of Alexandria in the video game Dishonored 2
The scientific research ship Hypatia in the novel Illuminae by Amie Kaufman and Jay Kristoff

Philosophy
Hypatia, a 1720 work by John Toland
Hypatia: A Journal of Feminist Philosophy, a scholarly publication for research in feminism and philosophy
Hypatia transracialism controversy, a dispute that began in April 2017 about an article in Hypatia

Astronomy
Hypatia (planet) or Iota Draconis b, an exoplanet
Hypatia (crater), a feature of the Moon
238 Hypatia, a C-type main belt asteroid
Hypatia (stone), a series of small stones, claimed by some to derive from the core of the hypothetical LDG comet

Other uses
Hypatia (moth), a genus of moths in the subfamily Arctiinae
Hypatia Sans an Adobe font created in 2002
Hyapatia Lee, actress